Mauricio Saucedo Guardia (born August 14, 1985 in Santa Cruz de la Sierra) is a Bolivian football midfielder. He was also a member of the Bolivia national team.

Club career
Saucedo developed his skills at Tahuichi Academy. In 2003, at age 18 he reached professional football when he signed for Bolívar, although he made his official debut in the Bolivian league with Iberoamericana later that year. In 2004, he joined La Paz F.C. but his appearances were sporadic, mainly coming off the bench.

The following year he transferred to San José, and his career finally began to sprout. In short time, Saucedo became one of the most valuable young prospects in the country and helped the club in obtaining the 2007 Clausura title.

In January 2009, he was signed by Universitario de Sucre along with other important players to fortify the squad before facing Copa Libertadores.

In February 2010, he travelled to Ukraine and signed for first division club FC Chornomorets Odesa. By August of that year, Saucedo returned to Bolivia and joined hometown club Oriente Petrolero. During his spell at the club he won the 2010 Clausura.

In July 2011, he was signed by Portuguese club Vitória S.C. After making only one appearance since the beginning of the season, he criticized  manager Rui Vitória for not giving him enough playing time which led to the club releasing the player on the December 16, 2011.

He was signed by Brazilian club Bragantino on January 5, 2012. Following an unsuccessful stint Saucedo found himself signing for The Strongest in May of that year. After a season with the atigrados, Saucedo moved to Universitario de Sucre for the second time in his career and helped the club obtain the 2014 Clausura.

Club titles

References

External links
 Mauricio Saucedo profile at BDFA
 
 

1985 births
Living people
Sportspeople from Santa Cruz de la Sierra
Association football midfielders
Bolivian footballers
Bolivia international footballers
Bolivian expatriate footballers
Club Bolívar players
La Paz F.C. players
Club San José players
Oriente Petrolero players
Universitario de Sucre footballers
FC Chornomorets Odesa players
Vitória S.C. players
Clube Atlético Bragantino players
Ukrainian Premier League players
Club Blooming players
Primeira Liga players
Expatriate footballers in Brazil
Expatriate footballers in Portugal
Expatriate footballers in Ukraine
Bolivian expatriate sportspeople in Portugal
2011 Copa América players